Georgios Koutoulas (born 9 February 1967) is a Greek former professional footballer who played as a defender, mostly for AEK Athens and a manager. He is currently the manager of Molaikos.

Club career
Koutoulas started from the academies of AEK Athens and in 1987 he was promoted to the men's team under Todor Veselinović. He played in mainly as center back and left back, while sometimes also played as a defensive midfielder.

He had a very good first season and was considered a big talent of the time after his first appearances. The next season under Dušan Bajević, he also did very well and helped AEK with his performances to win the league in 1989. In fact, he was the third AEK player in appearances during that season. Afterwards, he showed himself to be relatively stagnant, while also facing injuries and his participation was clearly smaller. During his last three seasons in the team he was purely a substitute footballer and he rarely played. At AEK he won in total 4 championships, 2 cups, 2 Super Cups and a League Cup in 1990.

On 8 August 1998 he was released from AEK and signed for PAS Giannina, where he played for one season. Afterwards he played another season for Panetolikos, before ending his career in 2000.

International career
Ιn 1988 Koutoulas played with Greece U21 in the European Championship where he reached the final against France, doing exceptionally well in both legs against Eric Cantona. However they lost the title after a 3–0 loss at the second leg in Stade Léo Lagrange.

Koutoulas played with Greece making 11 appearances between 1988 and 1990. He made his debut in 2 November 1988, replacing Tasos Mitropoulos at the 46th minute, in a 3–0 away defeat at the hands of Romania for the qualificating round of the 1990 FIFA World Cup

Managerial career
On 6 July 2017 Koutoulas started working as a coach for the women's club, Karyatides. From 28 June 2018, he is in charge of the youth and men's departments of Molaikos.

Personal life
After the end of his football career Koutoulas returned to is homeland, Skala of Laconia to enact with the cultivation of the land for a while before he got involved with coaching. He is also heavily involved in matches of the Veterans Association of AEK Athens. He was one of the 23 veteran football players of AEK who were honored at the opening of the Agia Sophia Stadium.

Honours

AEK Athens 
Alpha Ethniki: 1988–89, 1991–92, 1992–93, 1993–94
Greek Cup: 1995–96, 1996–97
Greek Super Cup: 1989, 1996
Greek League Cup: 1990

References

External links

1967 births
Living people
Greek footballers
Association football defenders
AEK Athens F.C. players
PAS Giannina F.C. players
Panetolikos F.C. players
Super League Greece players
Super League Greece 2 players
Greece under-21 international footballers
Greece international footballers
People from Laconia